]]
The Regional Agreement for the Medium Frequency Broadcasting Service in Region 2, commonly known as the Rio Agreement, is an international treaty defining standards for AM band (mediumwave) radio stations. It was signed in Rio de Janeiro, Brazil on 19 December 1981 and took effect on 1 July 1983 at 08:00 UTC. The agreement was the result of a conference organized by the International Telecommunication Union (ITU), and set standards for the ITU's Region 2, covering the western hemisphere countries located in North America, South America, and the Caribbean.

A major feature of the agreement was the division of stations into three main classifications: Class A, normally limited to 100 kilowatts (kW) daytime and 50 kW at night; Class B, limited to 50 kW, and Class C, limited to a nighttime power of 1 kW. Individual nations were also authorized to make further refinements based on their particular circumstances.

References 

Treaties entered into force in 1983
1981 in radio
1983 in radio
Bandplans
History of radio
Telecommunications treaties
Radio in North America
Radio in the Caribbean
Radio in Central America
Radio in South America